The Mask Zodiac is the eighth season of The Mask Singer, a Thai singing competition program presented by Kan Kantathavorn. The program aired on Workpoint TV on Thursday at 20:05 from 29 August 2019 to 7 November 2019.

The tournament format is different from other side series. It has only 12 contestants. This season combines zodiac signs and astrology.

Panel of Judges

First round

Semi-final

The Last Four/The Last Three

The Last Four

The Last Three

Final

Elimination table

References

The Mask Singer (Thai TV series)
2019 Thai television seasons